Ewing Thomas Kerr (January 21, 1900 – July 1, 1992) was a United States district judge of the United States District Court for the District of Wyoming.

Education and career
Born in Bowie, Texas, Kerr attended the University of Colorado Boulder and received a Bachelor of Arts degree from the University of Oklahoma in 1923 and a Bachelor of Science degree from University of Central Oklahoma in 1923. He read law to enter the bar in 1927. He was in private practice in Cheyenne, Wyoming from 1927 to 1929. He was an Assistant United States Attorney for the District of Wyoming from 1930 to 1933. He was the Attorney General of Wyoming from 1939 to 1943, and an attorney for the Wyoming Senate in 1943. He was in the United States Army from 1943 to 1946 and became a major. During World War II, he served in the Allied Command in Italy and became head of the legal division in that region. In 1945, he reorganized the civilian courts in Austria.

Federal judicial service

On October 22, 1955, Kerr received a recess appointment from President Dwight D. Eisenhower to a seat on the United States District Court for the District of Wyoming vacated by Judge Thomas Blake Kennedy. Formally nominated to the same seat by President Eisenhower on January 12, 1956, he was confirmed by the United States Senate on March 1, 1956, and received his commission the following day. He was a member of the Judicial Conference of the United States from 1962 to 1964. He assumed senior status on September 26, 1975. Kerr served until his death on July 1, 1992.

Honor

The Ewing T. Kerr Federal Building and U.S. Courthouse in Casper, Wyoming, was named in Kerr's honor.

References

Sources

1900 births
1992 deaths
Assistant United States Attorneys
People from Bowie, Texas
People from Cheyenne, Wyoming
University of Colorado alumni
University of Oklahoma alumni
University of Central Oklahoma alumni
Wyoming Attorneys General
Judges of the United States District Court for the District of Wyoming
United States district court judges appointed by Dwight D. Eisenhower
20th-century American judges
United States Army officers
United States Army personnel of World War II
20th-century American lawyers
United States federal judges admitted to the practice of law by reading law
United States Army Judge Advocate General's Corps